Dame Vivian Yvonne Hunt  (born July 1967) served as a senior partner for consulting firm McKinsey & Company, where she provided strategic advice to leading firms in the private, public and third sectors, and also served as Managing Partner for the UK and Ireland for seven years. She is the Chair of charity Teach First, the UK’s leading education charity, and Black Equity Organisation, the UK’s first national Black civil rights organisation. She has been named as one of the ten most influential black people in Britain by the Powerlist Foundation, and one of the 30 most influential people in the City of London by The Financial Times. She was made Dame Commander of the Order of the British Empire in Queen Elizabeth's 2018 New Year Honours for "services to the economy and to women in business".

Early life and education
Vivian Hunt was born in July 1967, and holds dual British and American citizenship. She graduated from Harvard College after which she joined the Peace Corps for whom she worked in Senegal as a midwife and primary care worker for over two years before studying for an MBA with Harvard Business School.

Career
Hunt was a senior partner for the consulting firm McKinsey & Company based in the United Kingdom and Ireland. As of January 2022, she had been with McKinsey for 27 years and, before becoming managing partner of the UK and Ireland offices, she was in charge of the company's Life Sciences division in the EMEA region for eight years. She has been named as one of the ten most influential black people in Britain by the Powerlist Foundation, and one of the 30 most influential people in the City of London by The Financial Times.

In January 2018, she was criticised by The Times when it was revealed that McKinsey & Company paid its women employees salaries that were 24% less than male employees and bonuses that were 76% lower than men despite Hunt having received her DBE for services to women in business.

In November 2019, she was appointed as the Chair of education charity Teach First, taking over from Paul Drechsler CBE. In 2022, she co-founded and became Chair of Black Equity Organisation, the UK’s first national Black civil rights organisation.

Personal life

She is married to Nicholas Basden, and they have two sons.

Honours
Hunt was made a Dame Commander of the Most Excellent Order of the British Empire in Queen Elizabeth's 2018 New Year Honours for "services to the economy and to women in business". She has honorary doctorates in law from the University of Warwick and the University of York and an honorary fellowship from University College London (UCL).

References

External links
Vivian Hunt talking on "Why Diversity Matters".

1967 births
American emigrants to the United Kingdom
American expatriates in Senegal
American midwives
American women chief executives
Black British businesspeople
British women chief executives
Dames Commander of the Order of the British Empire
Date of birth missing (living people)
Harvard Business School alumni
Harvard College alumni
Living people
McKinsey & Company people
Naturalised citizens of the United Kingdom
Peace Corps volunteers
Place of birth missing (living people)